The Margraviate of Meissen was a territorial state on the border of the Holy Roman Empire. The margravines of Meissen were the consorts of the margraves of Meissen.

Margravine of Meissen

Non-dynastic, 963–985

Ekkehardingian dynasty, 985–1046

Weimar-Orlamünde dynasty, 1046–1062

Brunonen dynasty, 1067–1089

Wettin dynasty, 1089–1123

Groitzsch dynasty, 1123–1124

Wettin dynasty, 1124–1547

As a title in pretense

See also 
List of Saxon consorts

Sources 
Meissen

Margravines of Meissen
Meissen
Meissen